Va'a, also called the outrigger canoe, for the 2009 Pacific Mini Games, was held in Rarotonga in the Cook Islands. The sprint races took place at Muri Lagoon and the distance races started and finished at Avarua Wharf.

Medal table

Medal summary

Men

Women

References

Outrigger canoeing at the Pacific Games
Pacific Mini Games
2009 in Cook Islands sport